William Cantrell (died 1585), was an English politician.

He was a Member (MP) of the Parliament of England for Lewes in 1563.

References

Year of birth missing
1585 deaths
English MPs 1563–1567